Koknese Castle is a complex in Koknese, Latvia, dating from the 13th century. The castle was situated on a high bluff overlooking the Daugava river valley. In 1965 a hydroelectric dam was built downriver, creating a reservoir that partially submerged the castle and flooded the surrounding valley.

History
Before the arrival of the Teutonic Knights, Koknese was the site of a wooden hill fort inhabited by the Balts. In 1209 Bishop Albert of Riga ordered the construction of a stone castle at the site, naming it Kokenhusen. For the first 50 years of its existence, Koknese was solely used as a defensive fort, but by 1277, Koknese had enough population to receive city rights. Koknese also became a member of the Hanseatic League thanks to its strategic location on the Daugava trade route.

The castle was heavily contested between Polish, Swedish and Russian forces in the 16th and 17th centuries. It changed hands many times, while the native inhabitants endured periodic slaughter, capture, and famine. In 1701, during the Great Northern War, Koknese was finally blown up by retreating forces to avoid the strategic castle falling into advancing Russian hands. The castle was never rebuilt after this and was left unattended for 200 years before being turned into a tourist attraction by the USSR.

The town around Koknese began to reappear in the 19th century, after serfdom was abolished and a railroad station was built in the village, facilitating movement to the area. In 1900, a park was established around the castle ruins, and Koknese became a popular summer resort. The area was known for its scenic waterfalls, cliffs, and look-outs. In 1965, the Soviet government built Pļaviņas Hydro Power Plant in the town of Aizkraukle. The reservoir flooded the entire length of the Daugava to Pļaviņas. Koknese Castle, once sitting atop a high bluff, was placed at the river's edge, while the scenic Daugava valley was submerged.

Gallery

See also 
Principality of Koknese

References

External links

Koknese
Castles in Latvia
Castles of the Livonian Order
Demolished buildings and structures in Latvia
Buildings and structures demolished in 1701